The Schalkholz Passage Grave, also known as Schalkholz-Vierth is a megalithic burial site of the Neolithic period and of the Funnelbeaker culture in Vierth, a district of Schalkholz in the province of Schleswig-Holstein in Germany. During the late Bronze Age or early Iron Age, it was used for a secondary burial site and was expanded upon. It has the Sprockhoff number 139 and the site number LA 33 or Heide LA 5. The grave was archaeologically investigated in 1969 and 1970 and was afterwards moved to the nearby town of Heide. In 2021 it was moved back to Schalkholz.

See also 
 Neolithic
 Secondary burial

References 

 Duday, Henri, et al. The Archaeology of the Dead: Lectures in Archaeothanatology. United Kingdom, Oxbow Books, 2009.
 Orschiedt, Jörg. "Secondary burial in the Magdalenian: the Brillenhöhle (Blaubeuren, southwest Germany)." PALEO. Revue d'archéologie préhistorique 14 (2002): 241-256.
 Grünberg, J. M., et al. "Mesolithic burials—Rites, symbols and social organisation of early postglacial communities." Halle, Congresses of the State Museum for Prehistory (2016).
 Haddow, Scott D., and Christopher J. Knüsel. "Skull retrieval and secondary burial practices in the Neolithic Near East: Recent insights from Çatalhöyük, Turkey." Bioarchaeology International 1.1/2 (2017): 52-71.
 Redfern, Rebecca. "New evidence for Iron Age secondary burial practice and bone modification from Gussage All Saints and Maiden Castle (Dorset, England)." Oxford Journal of Archaeology 27.3 (2008): 281-301.
 Weiss-Krejci, Estella. "Restless corpses:‘secondary burial’in the Babenberg and Habsburg dynasties." Antiquity 75.290 (2001): 769-780.
 Tsu, Timothy Y. "Toothless ancestors, felicitous descendants: the rite of secondary burial in south Taiwan." Asian folklore studies (2000): 1-22.
 Rendu, William, et al. "Evidence supporting an intentional Neandertal burial at La Chapelle-aux-Saints." Proceedings of the National Academy of Sciences 111.1 (2014): 81-86.
 Miles Douglass: Socio-Economic Aspects of Secondary Burial. Oceania, Vol. 35. 1965.
 Märta Strömberg: Die Megalithgräber von Hagestad. Zur Problematik von Grabbauten und Grabriten. Acta Archaeologica Lundensia, Vol. 8. Bonn and Lund, 1971.
 Gowland, Rebecca, and Christopher Knusel. The social archaeology of funerary remains. Vol. 1. Oxbow Books, 2009.
 Nilsson Stutz, L, Larsson, L. and Zagorska, I., 2013. The persistent presence of the dead: recent excavations at the hunter-gatherer cemetery at Zvejnieki (Latvia). Antiquity, 87(338), pp. 1016-1029.

External links 
 Commons: Großsteingrab Schalkholz-Vierth - collection of pictures, videos, and audio files
 The Megalithic Portal: Original Location, Location in Heide
 KuLaDig, Kultur.Landschaft.Digital: Großsteingrab Heide LA 5
 Megalithic Routes: Das Großsteingrab von Schalkholz-Vierth in Heide

 
Megalithic monuments in Germany